The Korea Science Award is an award presented to South Koreans and Korean scientists working in domestic universities or research positions. It is currently jointly presented by the Ministry of Science and ICT and the National Research Foundation of Korea. Research achievements are limited to that of a single project conducted in Korea. Potential recipients go through a several stage review which includes consolation with foreign scholars. 

From 1987, it was biennially awarded to frequently three to four recipients. From 2016, it is given annually to two individuals while two other individuals are presented with the Korea Engineering Award. The Korea Science Award comes with a presidential commendation and a research grant of 30 million won, down from 50 million given in the past. For certain years, there is not a winner from certain fields.

Recipients

References

External links
 National Research Foundation of Korea

South Korean awards
Awards established in 1987
1987 establishments in South Korea